Cape Scott is in Victoria Land, Antarctica.

Cape Scott may also refer to:
Cape Scott Provincial Park on Vancouver Island, Canada
Cape Scott Lighthouse on Vancouver Island, Canada
, a former Canadian warship
Fleet Maintenance Facility Cape Scott, at Canadian Forces Base Halifax